Prikaspiysky is a rural locality (a settlement) and the administrative center of Prikaspiysky Selsoviet, Narimanovsky District, Astrakhan Oblast, Russia. The population was 1,597 as of 2010. There are 5 streets.

Geography 
Prikaspiysky is located 110 km southwest of Narimanov (the district's administrative centre) by road. Buruny is the nearest rural locality.

References 

Rural localities in Narimanovsky District